Dušan Stevanović may refer to:
 Dusan Stevanovic (footballer, born 1992), Serbian football midfielder
 Dušan Stevanović (footballer, born 1996), Serbian football centre-back